Dariusz Dźwigała (born 22 March 1969) is a Polish former football manager and former player. His son Adam Dźwigała is also a professional footballer who plays for FC St. Pauli.

Having started his career at Drukarz Warszawa, he played for several other teams including Polonia Warsaw and Gwardia Warsaw. He moved to Turkey in 2001 where he played for Diyarbakırspor, before returning to Poland the following year.

With Górnik Zabrze, Dźwigała captained a club team into the UEFA Cup.

He worked as a coach with Wisła Płock in the Ekstraklasa.

References

External links
 

1969 births
Living people
Footballers from Warsaw
Association football midfielders
Polish footballers
Polonia Warsaw players
Hapoel Kfar Saba F.C. players
Górnik Zabrze players
GKS Katowice players
Pogoń Szczecin players
Diyarbakırspor footballers
Expatriate footballers in Turkey
Expatriate footballers in Israel
Polish football managers
Radomiak Radom managers
Arka Gdynia managers
Polonia Warsaw managers
Ząbkovia Ząbki managers
Podbeskidzie Bielsko-Biała managers
Wisła Płock managers
Ekstraklasa managers
I liga managers
II liga managers